The National Trails System is a series of trails in the United States designated "to promote the preservation of, public access to, travel within, and enjoyment and appreciation of the open-air, outdoor areas and historic resources of the Nation". There are four types of trails: the national scenic trails, national historic trails, national recreation trails, and connecting or side trails. The national trails provide opportunities for hiking and historic education, as well as horseback riding, biking, camping, scenic driving, water sports, and other activities. The scenic and historic trails are in every state, and Virginia and Wyoming have the most running through them, with six. 

In response to a call by President Lyndon B. Johnson to have a cooperative program to build public trails for "the forgotten outdoorsmen of today" in both urban and backcountry areas, the Bureau of Outdoor Recreation released a report in 1966 entitled Trails for America. The study made recommendations for a network of national scenic trails, park and forest trails, and metropolitan area trails to provide recreational opportunities, with evaluations of several possible trails, both scenic and historic. The program for long-distance natural trails was created on October 2, 1968, by the National Trails System Act, which also designated two national scenic trails, the Appalachian Trail and the Pacific Crest Trail, and requested that an additional fourteen trail routes be studied for possible inclusion. Sponsored by Senators Henry M. Jackson and Gaylord Nelson and Representative Roy A. Taylor, part of the bill's impetus was threats of development along the Appalachian Trail, which was at risk of losing its wilderness character, and the Land and Water Conservation Fund was used to acquire lands. In 1978, as a result of the study of trails that were most significant for their historic associations, national historic trails were created as a new category with four trails designated that year. Since 1968, over forty trail routes have been studied for inclusion in the system.

The scenic and historic trails are congressionally established long-distance trails, administered by the National Park Service (NPS), United States Forest Service (USFS), and/or Bureau of Land Management (BLM). These agencies may acquire lands to protect key rights of way, sites, resources and viewsheds, though the trails do not have fixed boundaries. They work in cooperation with each other, states, local governments, land trusts, and private landowners to coordinate and protect lands and structures along these trails, enabling them to be accessible to the public. These partnerships between the agency administrators and local site managers are vital for resource protection and the visitor experience. The Federal Interagency Council on the National Trails System promotes collaboration and standardization in trail development and protection. National recreation trails and connecting and side trails do not require congressional action, but are recognized by actions of the secretary of the interior or the secretary of agriculture. The national trails are supported by volunteers at private non-profit organizations that work with the federal agencies under the Partnership for the National Trails System and other trail type-specific advocacy groups.

For fiscal year 2021, the 24 trails administered by the NPS received a budget of $15.4 million.

National Scenic Trails

The eleven national scenic trails were established to provide outdoor recreation opportunities and to conserve portions of the natural landscape with significant scenic, natural, cultural, or historic importance. These trails are continuous non-motorized long-distance trails that can be backpacked from end-to-end or hiked for short segments, except for Natchez Trace NST, which consists of five shorter, disconnected trail segments. The Trails for America report said, "Each National Scenic Trail should stand out in its own right as a recreation resource of superlative quality and of physical challenge." Most notably, the national scenic trail system provides access to the crest of the Appalachian Mountains in the east via the Appalachian Trail, of the Rocky Mountains in the west on the Continental Divide Trail, and of the Cascade and Sierra Nevada ranges on the Pacific Crest Trail, which make up the Triple Crown of Hiking. Other places of note include the southern wetlands and Gulf Coast on the Florida Trail, the North Woods on the North Country Trail, the variety of southwestern mountains and ecosystems on the Arizona Trail, and the remote high-mountain landscape near the Canadian border on the Pacific Northwest Trail. 

Due to the extent of construction of route realignments, segment alternatives, and measurement methods, some sources vary in their distances reported and values may be rounded. 

Of the eleven national scenic trails, Appalachian, Natchez Trace, and Potomac Heritage are official units of the NPS; though their enabling legislation does not distinguish them, these have more direct administration. The NPS manages its other three trails more as a coordinator with local partners than as an administrator. The NPS manages its scenic trails like its other areas, as long, linear parks. Five trails are overseen by the U.S. Forest Service. 

In 2022 Arlette Laan, whose trail name was "Apple Pie," became the first woman known to have completely hiked all eleven of the national scenic trails.

National Historic Trails

The 21 national historic trails are designated to protect the courses of significant overland or water routes that reflect the history of the nation. They represent the earliest European travels in the country in Chesapeake Bay and on Spanish royal roads; the nation's struggle for independence on the Overmountain Victory National Historic Trail and Washington–Rochambeau Revolutionary Route; westward migrations on the Oregon, California, and Mormon Trails, which traverse some of the same route; and the development of continental commerce on the Santa Fe Trail, Old Spanish Trail, and Pony Express. They also memorialize the forced displacement and hardships of the Native Americans on the Trail of Tears and Nez Perce National Historic Trail.

Their routes follow the nationally significant, documented historical journeys of notable individuals or groups but are not necessarily meant to be continuously traversed today; they are largely networks of partner sites along marked auto routes rather than the exact non-motorized trails as originally used. Interpretative sites are often at other areas of the National Park System along the trails, as well as locally operated museums and sites. The National Historic Trails Interpretive Center in Wyoming is on the Oregon, California, Mormon Pioneer, and Pony Express National Historic Trails and has exhibits on Western emigration. Nine are administered by the NPS National Trails Office in Santa Fe and Salt Lake City. 

National historic trails were authorized under the National Parks and Recreation Act of 1978, amending the National Trails System Act of 1968.

Connecting or side trails
The act also established a category of trails known as connecting or side trails. Though there are no guidelines for how these are managed, these have been designated by the secretary of the interior to extend trails beyond the original congressionally established route. Seven side trails have been designated:

 Timms Hill Trail – , connects the Ice Age Trail to Wisconsin's highest point, Timms Hill (1990)
 Anvik Connector – , joins the Iditarod Trail to the village of Anvik, Alaska (1990)
Susquehanna River Component Connecting Trail – , extends the Captain John Smith Chesapeake National Historic Trail up the Susquehanna River in Pennsylvania and New York (2012)
Chester River Component Connecting Trail – , extends the Captain John Smith Chesapeake National Historic Trail up the Chester River in Maryland (2012)
Upper Nanticoke River Component Connecting Trail – , extends the Captain John Smith Chesapeake National Historic Trail up the Nanticoke River in Delaware (2012)
Upper James River Component Connecting Trail – , extends the Captain John Smith Chesapeake National Historic Trail up the James River in Virginia (2012)
Marion to Selma Connecting Trail – , connects the Selma to Montgomery National Historic Trail to Marion, Alabama, where Jimmie Lee Jackson was murdered in 1965 (2015)

National Recreation Trails

National recreation trail (NRT) is a designation given to existing trails that contribute to the recreational and conservation goals of a national network of trails.

Most NRTs are hiking trails, but a significant number are multi-use trails or bike paths, including rail trails and greenways. Some are intended for use with watercraft, horses, cross-country skis, or off-road recreational vehicles. There are a number of water trails that make up the National Water Trails System subprogram. Eligible trails must be complete, well designed and maintained, and open to the public.

The NPS and the USFS jointly administer the National Recreation Trails Program with help from other federal and nonprofit partners, notably American Trails, the lead nonprofit for developing and promoting NRTs. The secretary of interior or the secretary of agriculture (if on USFS land) designates national recreation trails that are of local and regional significance. Managers of eligible trails can apply for designation with the support of all landowners and their state's trail coordinator (if on non-federal land). Designated trails become part of the National Trails System and receive promotional benefits, use of the NRT logo, technical and networking assistance, and preference for funding through the Department of Transportation's Recreational Trails Program.

American Trails sponsors an annual NRT photo contest and a biennial symposium and maintains the NRT database.

National Geologic Trail 
The first national geologic trail was established by the Omnibus Public Land Management Act of 2009, though it did not amend the National Trails System Act to create an official category.

See also 

Protected areas of the United States
List of long-distance footpaths
Long-distance trails in the United States

References

Further reading 
 Karen Berger, Bart Smith (photography), and Bill McKibben (foreword): America's Great Hiking Trails. Rizzoli, 2014, 
 Karen Berger, Bart Smith (photography), and Ken Burns & Dayton Duncan (foreword) (2014), America's National Historic Trails: Walking the Trails of History. Rizzoli, 2020,

External links

 Partnership for National Trails System
National Trails System – National Park Service
National Historic Trails
National Scenic Trails
National Recreation Trails
America's National Trails – U.S. Forest Service
National Scenic and Historic Trails – Bureau of Land Management
National Recreation Trails Program – American Trails
National Recreation Trails database
The National Trails System: A Brief Overview – Congressional Research Service

 01
Trails
Hiking trails in the United States
Scenic highways in the United States
United States federal public land legislation
1968 in law
1968 in the United States